The 2019–20 season is Pallacanestro Trieste's 45th in existence and the club's 2nd consecutive season in the top flight of Italian basketball.

Overview 
The 2019-20 season was hit by the coronavirus pandemic that compelled the federation to suspend and later cancel the competition without assigning the title to anyone. Trieste ended the championship in 16th position.

Kit 
Supplier: Adidas / Sponsor: Allianz

Players

Current roster

Depth chart

Squad changes

In

|}

Out

|}

Confirmed 

|}

Coach

Competitions

Serie A

References 

2019–20 in Italian basketball by club